Farshid (or Farsheed) is a Persian proper name. It consists from two morphemes, far (splendour, shine) + shîd (sun, sun beams). In this manner we could translate the Old Persian proper name Farshid/Farsheed as 'sunshine' or 'the splendor or the pomp of the sun'. This name is commonly used in Iran.

People with the given name Farshid
 Farshid Bagheri, Iranian footballer
 Farshid Delshad, Iranian linguist and writer who lives in Germany
 Farshid Esmaeili, Iranian football player
 Farshid Guilak, American engineer and Professor of Orthopaedic Surgery at Washington University
 Farshid Jamshidian, finance researcher and academic working in the United States and the Netherlands
 Farshid Karimi, Iranian football goalkeeper
 Farshid Manafi, Iranian radio presenter and producer
 Farshid Mesghali, Iranian painter and book illustrator
 Farshid Moussavi, Professor of Architecture at Harvard Graduate School of Design
 Farshid Talebi, Iranian football player
 Farshid fakhri, Iranian artist

Fictional characters
A character in Shahnameh (brother of Piran)

References

Persian masculine given names